Abandanak (also Romanized as Ābandānak; also known as Ābandāk) is a village in Kheyrud Kenar Rural District, in the Central District of Nowshahr County, Mazandaran Province, Iran. At the 2006 census, its population was 874, in 227 families.

References 

Populated places in Nowshahr County